Young Robin Hood is an animated series produced for television by Hanna-Barbera, CINAR and France Animation and aired in syndication from 1991 to 1992. It ran for two seasons as part of the Sunday-morning programming block, The Funtastic World of Hanna-Barbera (1985–1994). The show takes place when Robin Hood is a teenager, Richard the Lion Heart is on his "first crusade" and Robin's father, the Earl of Huntington, joins him. Young Robin Hood was Hanna-Barbera's second adaptation of the legend of Robin Hood, after their 1972 television special The Adventures of Robin Hoodnik.

Synopsis 
Robin Hood quickly finds himself at odds with the establishment; the Sheriff of Nottingham and Prince John, and creates a camp in Sherwood forest with other youngsters, the only girl, Marian, is a ward of the sheriff and spy for Robin. The main thing about Robin's youth in this case, is that his plans do not always work and he is occasionally questioned because of his youth, the fact that he is a known criminal and has no legal guardian to vouch for him.

Characters 
 Robin Hood (voiced by Thor Bishopric) – the boy in the county with a bow. He rarely is beaten by other archers. As a nobleman, he understands Latin, has a tame Hawk called Arrow. Arrow is used to pass messages between him and Marian.
 Little John (voiced by Terrence Scammell) – a blacksmith's son. Typically one of Robin's most loyal followers, but is not above criticizing Robin's plans.
 Alan-a-Dale (voiced by Michael O'Reilly) – a very young, romantic minstrel.
 Will Scarlet (voiced by Sonja Ball) – a young, talented thief, who idolizes Robin. He is a technical talent and creates traps and machines.
 Brother Tuck (voiced by Harry Standjofski) – a very young monk, sometimes questioning his choice being an outlaw. He is very pious and speaks Latin every now and then.
 Marian (voiced by Anik Matern) – Robin's sweetheart and a ward at Nottingham, sometimes suspected of conspiring with him.
 Haggala (voiced by Bronwen Mantel) – a kind-hearted sorceress whose spells don't always work. She has a cat named Miranda.
 Prince John (voiced by Michael Rudder) – spoiled boy who whines about who should be king. Sometimes tries to usurp Richard but the attempts are thwarted by Robin, or John's own ineptitude.
 Sheriff of Nottingham (voiced by A.J. Henderson) – a harsh man and good swordsman.
 Gilbert of Gisbourn (voiced by Mark Hellman) – lieutenant to the sheriff and has a crush on Marian. He often tries to win her over and Marian uses it to get information. He has a dog named Bruno.

Episodes

Seasons 1 
The Wild Boar of Sherwood
The Viking Treasure
Jest in Time
The Black Viper
Magalah's Day in Court
For Love or Money
King of the Outlaws
Duel of Thieves
The Prince Who Was Late for Dinner
Smuggler's Cove
The Underhills
Merry No More
The Phantom Horse

Seasons 2 
The Black Bog of Sherwood
Message from a Distant Land
Good News, Bad News
The Band Takes the Cake
Fowl Play
The Return of Jesse Strongbow
Knight's Armor
Sherwood Stakes
The Shrouded Man
You're Gonna Be a Star
The Magic Carpet
Babe in the Woods
The Spanish Prince

Production 
The series was a joint American-Canadian-French production of Hanna-Barbera, CINAR and France Animation and Antenne-2 in partnership with the Global Television Network, the Family Channel, Centre National De La Cinématographie and Sofica Cofimage 3. The animation is produced by France Animation and Crayon Animation, while the overseas production services were handled by Fil-Cartoons (subsidiary of Hanna-Barbera) in the Philippines, and two studios in South Korea: Sae Rom Productions and Big Star Enterprises.

Broadcast 
Teletoon aired the series in Canada in 1998.

Home media 
In late 1991, Hanna-Barbera Home Video released three of the series' episodes individually on VHS: "The Wild Boar of Sherwood", "The Viking Treasure", and "The King of the Outlaws". There are currently no plans for the complete series to be released on DVD.

References

External links 
 
 Young Robin Hood Episode Guide @ Big Cartoon Database

Robin Hood television series
1990s American animated television series
1991 American television series debuts
1992 American television series endings
1990s Canadian animated television series
1991 Canadian television series debuts
1992 Canadian television series endings
1990s French animated television series
1991 French television series debuts
1992 French television series endings
BBC children's television shows
First-run syndicated television programs in the United States
First-run syndicated television shows in Canada
English-language television shows
Television series by DHX Media
Television series by Hanna-Barbera
Television series by Cookie Jar Entertainment
The Funtastic World of Hanna-Barbera
American children's animated action television series
American children's animated adventure television series
American children's animated fantasy television series
Canadian children's animated action television series
Canadian children's animated adventure television series
Canadian children's animated fantasy television series
French children's animated action television series
French children's animated adventure television series
French children's animated fantasy television series